Why We Love Women is a 2004 short story collection by the Romanian writer Mircea Cărtărescu. The twenty stories all have a female protagonist, and had previously been published in the magazine Elle. The book was published in English in 2011 through University of Plymouth Press.

See also
 2004 in literature
 Romanian literature

References

External links
 Why We Love Women at the publisher's website 

2004 short story collections
Romanian short story collections
Works by Mircea Cărtărescu